James Kenneth Harold Graham (born November 25, 1941) is a former American football safety who played seven seasons as a professional with the American Football League's San Diego Chargers and with the National Football League's Cincinnati Bengals and Pittsburgh Steelers.  Graham was an AFL All-Star in 1965, 1967, 1968 and 1969.

See also
 List of American Football League players

References

External links
 NFL.com player page

1941 births
Living people
People from Texarkana, Texas
Players of American football from Texas
American football safeties
Sacramento City Panthers football players
Washington State Cougars football players
Cincinnati Bengals players
Pittsburgh Steelers players
San Diego Chargers players
American Football League players
American Football League All-Star players
American Football League All-Time Team